Tomáš Šmíd was the defending champion but did not participate this year.

Henri Leconte won the title, defeating Thierry Tulasne 7–5, 6–3 in the final.

Seeds

  Henri Leconte (champion)
  Thierry Tulasne (final)
  Horacio de la Peña (first round)
  Fernando Luna (quarterfinals)
  Pablo Arraya (first round)
  Ronald Agénor (first round)
  Michiel Schapers (first round)
  Mel Purcell (second round)

Draw

Finals

Top half

Bottom half

External links
 ATP main draw

1986 in Swiss sport
1986 Grand Prix (tennis)
1986 Geneva Open